Major General Ýaýlym Ýagmyrowiç Berdiýew (born 1972) is a Turkmen general and politician who has served as the minister of national security and as the secretary of the State Security Council of Turkmenistan. He previously also served as the minister of defense of Turkmenistan from 2015 to 2018.

Biography
He was born in the Baharden District of the Turkmen SSR. In 1994, he graduated from the Turkmen Agricultural University Named after S.A. Nyýazow, majoring in mechanical engineering. After graduation and active military service, he began his career in 1995 as a mechanic in Serdar. In 2006, he became Chairman of the State Service for Registration of Foreign Citizens. The following year, he was appointed as the Head of the State Migration Service and later the State Customs Service of Turkmenistan. From 21 January 2009 to 29 March 2011, he served his first term as Minister of Defense. That same day, he was appointed Minister of National Security of Turkmenistan while retaining the post of Secretary of the State Security Council of Turkmenistan, simultaneously awarded the rank of Lieutenant General.

On 5 October 2015, he was relieved of his post as Minister of National Security and reappointed Minister of Defense. During the celebrations on the occasion of Navy Day on 9 October 2015, a decree was signed to confer on him the rank of colonel general. On 22 January 2020, a severe reprimand was announced "for improper performance of duties, work shortcomings", resulting in his demotion from colonel general to major general and relieved of the post of Secretary of the State Security Council. On 12 February 2020, he was relieved of his post in the MNB and was transferred to another job.

Awards

 Medal "Edermenlik" (2009)
 Medal "For Impeccable Service to the Fatherland" (2010) 
 Medal "For the Love of the Fatherland"  (2014)
 Jubilee Medal "19 Years of Independence of Turkmenistan" (2010)
 Jubilee Medal "20 Years of Independence of Turkmenistan" (2011)

See also 
Government of Turkmenistan
Ministry of Defense of Turkmenistan

References 

1972 births
Living people
Ministers for National Security of Turkmenistan
Ministers of Defence of Turkmenistan
Turkmenistani generals